A total solar eclipse occurred on June 8, 1937. A solar eclipse occurs when the Moon passes between Earth and the Sun, thereby totally or partly obscuring the image of the Sun for a viewer on Earth. A total solar eclipse occurs when the Moon's apparent diameter is larger than the Sun's, blocking all direct sunlight, turning day into darkness. Totality occurs in a narrow path across Earth's surface, with the partial solar eclipse visible over a surrounding region thousands of kilometres wide.
The path of totality crossed the Pacific Ocean starting in Gilbert and Ellice Islands (now belonging to Tuvalu and Kiribati) on June 9th (Wednesday ), and ending at sunset in Peru on June 8th (Tuesday). At sunrise totality lasted 3 minutes, 6.8 seconds and at sunset totality lasted 3 minutes, 5.1 seconds. American astronomy professor Ethelwynn Rice Beckwith traveled to Peru to see this eclipse, and described the event in detail for the Oberlin Alumnae Magazine in 1937, in an article titled "Three Minutes in Peru."

With a maximum eclipse of 7 minutes and 4.06 seconds, this was the longest total solar eclipse since July 1, 1098 which lasted 7 minutes and 5.34 seconds. A longer total solar eclipse occurred on June 20, 1955.

Related eclipses

Solar eclipses 1935–1938

Saros 136

Tritos series

See also 
  - describing events where a Pacific island disputed between the UK and the US was used to view the eclipse

Notes

References

 Fotos of Solar Corona June 8, 1937

1937 06 08
1937 in science
1937 06 08
June 1937 events